The World Curling Tour (WCT) is a group of curling bonspiels featuring the best male, female, and mixed doubles curlers in the world.

History
The World Curling Tour was founded by former World Champion Ed Lukowich, with later assistance from John Kawaja.

The World Curling Tour commenced in 1992, with men's events only at first. It replaced the "Canadian Curling Tour" held the previous season. The first season consisted of 48 events (with only one outside Canada), and was sponsored by Seagram's distillery. Teams earned points in every event with the top 30 qualifying for the season ending "V.O. Cup", today known as the Players' Championship. Its first president and CEO was Lukowich. The first two events were held on the first weekend of October 1992, the Red Carpet Classic in Regina, Saskatchewan and a qualifier for the Coca-Cola Classic in Winnipeg.

In 2001, the WCT introduced a series of Grand Slam events for men which was later followed in 2006 by Grand Slam events for women. These became known as the Grand Slam of Curling and featured large payouts. Originally, curlers who participated in Grand Slam events were obliged to not participate in their respective Brier playdowns, however this was quickly rescinded.

Most WCT events are held in the Fall, and early Winter to avoid competing with the Brier and Scotties playdowns.

The WCT is experimenting with length of games in two interesting ways. The first is that the games are only eight ends long with a 4th end break. The second is that the time clocks only count "thinking time", so the clock goes off when the players throw the rock. The reason is that time clocks, an innovation created to speed up the game, would stop as soon as the stone stopped. With the old system where teams were given 73 minutes of time if a team was losing, they would throw more draw shots which take time. The team that is winning throws more hits and thus ends up with more time if needed. So the WCT moved to "Thinking time" to even out this discrepancy. With this new system, each team is given 40 minutes of “Thinking Time” plus an additional 5 minutes if the game goes to an extra end. The system is now a standard in Curling Canada championship events, though with a 38-minute limit for standard 10-end curling (four minutes for extra ends) and 22 minutes for mixed doubles. The 2018 Canada Cup experimented with breaking the time down by ends — four minutes per end in the first half of the game, and four minutes, 15 seconds in the second half; if time runs out, the offending team can play no more rocks in the end.

The team with the most winnings at the end of the year wins the Founders Trophy. The winners in 2007 were Kevin Martin's team who won a total of $176,000.

A separate Women's World Curling Tour existed, until it was merged into the WCT in 2005.

As of 2018, the Men's and Women's World Curling Tour begins its debut in early August with the Hokkaido Bank Curling Classic and has events taking place all throughout the curling season until the Champions Cup in late April. Each of the bonspiel events on the World Curling Tour lasts for approximately 3 days with a final payoff ranging in the thousands of dollars for the winners. There are 7 major men's and women's tournaments that are held throughout the year, each with a final cash prize of at least $100,000 for the winning team. These are the Elite 10, the Masters, the Tour Challenge, the National, the Canadian Open, the Players' Championship, and the Champions Cup. Together, these events are known as Grand Slam events because of the large payoff that is associated with them as well as the number of high-level curlers that play in these tournaments. There also used to be 2 more Grand Slam events for the women called the Sobeys Slam and Wayden Transportation Ladies Classic but these were discontinued in 2010.

On October 2, 2006, the license of rights for the Grand Slam of Curling was sold to Insight Sports Ltd. but was later sold again in August 2012 to Rogers Communications. The WCT naming rights were then sold to Asham, a long time contributor to the sport, until 2014 and because of this, the World Curling Tour was renamed Asham's World Curling Tour. The Grand Slam was originally simply called the Grand Slam of Curling until 2008 when the rights were sold by the CBC to Capital One bank which renamed the Grand Slam the Capital One Grand Slam of Curling. Unlike the other World Curling Tour events, these Grand Slams they are played in 8-end games as opposed to the usual 10 end games found in the other WCT events. Another new rule that was first put into practice at the men's nationals in 2014 is the 5 rock rule which increased the 4 rock rule and free guard zone rule by another rock. This changed the starting strategy of the game as the team with the hammer was able to throw up two guards uncontested instead of the usual 1 allowed with the previously used 4 rock rule. Through the addition of the Grand Slam events and the new rule changes, the WCT is rapidly becoming a well known series to sports fans worldwide.

On June 28, 2017, the Canadian-based World Curling Tour officially merged with the European and Asian based Curling Champions Tour to create a worldwide entity focused on growing the game on the international stage. The World Curling Tour World rights holder is now the Zurich Switzerland-based company CCT Event GmbH. This merger has also led to the growth of a Mixed Doubles tour, along with adding Junior and Wheelchair curling tours to expand the offering.

Men's events
As of the 2019-2020 curling season

Grand Slam events indicated in bold.

New events
Some events were added for the 2020–21 season:

Women's events
As of 2018-2019 curling season

Grand Slam events indicated in bold.

Mixed doubles events 
As of 2018-2019 curling season

See also
List of teams on the World Curling Tour
Ontario Curling Tour

References

External links 

 
Curling tours
Multi-national professional sports leagues
Curling